Homelessness in Scotland is considered a serious social issue. Since the Scottish devolution from the United Kingdom in 1999 and the reconvening of the Scottish Parliament homeless legislation and policy in Scotland has diverged in important ways from the rest of the UK.

The Scottish parliament passed the Homelessness etc. (Scotland) Act 2003 which has an aim of ensuring that by 2012 everyone assessed as being unintentionally homeless will be entitled to permanent accommodation. In addition, the Homeless Persons (Unsuitable Accommodation) (Scotland) Order came into force in December 2004 and requires councils to ensure that pregnant women and households with children are not placed in unsuitable temporary accommodation, unless there are exceptional circumstances.
 
According to Shelter, in 2019-20, 31,333 households were assessed as being homeless, which is a 4% increase on 2018-19. 51,365 people were in those households; 35,654 adults and 15,711 children. The number of households accepted as homeless or potentially homeless has increased by 25 per cent since 2000-2001 according to Shelter. There are various organisations which have been set up in order to combat homelessness and poverty in Scotland such as Glasgow Needy, Glasgow City Mission. These organisation offer food to the homeless as they are touched by deprivation of poverty.

, 14,151 households were in temporary accommodation (a 24% increase from 2019–20). Among these households are 7,280 children. There were 4,595 instances where temporary accommodation was not offered and 500 breaches of the unsuitable accommodation order.

15% of people repeat homelessness within 5 years.

The most common reasons for homelessness in Scotland in 2019-20 was the household being asked to leave or a dispute in the house..  This comes under the term 'relationship breakdown'.  This has been the main cause of homelessness for the past 20 years, since homelessness statistics were collected on a national basis.

Statistics are based upon all people / households who approach their Local Authority (Council) and state they are homeless, or about to be homeless within the next 2 months.  These statistics are sent to the Scottish Government, who produce these every 6 months.  The statistics don't include people who are homeless but don't go to their Local Authority.

See also
Scottish Housing Regulator

History:
Impotent poor
Poor laws
Deinstitutionalisation

General:
 Homelessness in the United Kingdom

References

External links 

Scottish Government policies to tackle homelessness and Homelessness Statistics
Shelter Scotland
Homeless Network Scotland
The Homelessness Monitor: Scotland 2012 - Crisis
Policy Scotland
Homeless Action Scotland

 
Housing in Scotland
Poverty in Scotland